Shri Samrajeswar Pashupatinath Mahadev Mandir, also known as the Nepali Mandir, Kanthwala Mandir and Mini Khajuraho (Kanthwala in Hindi means wooden), is one of the oldest and most famous temples in the holy city of Varanasi. This temple has great religious importance in Hinduism and is dedicated to the Lord Shiva. Constructed in the 19th century A.D by the King of Nepal, the temple is made of terracotta, stone and wood and is replica of the Pashupatinath Temple in Kathmandu.

History

The King of Nepal, Rana Bahadur Shah took exile in Varanasi from 1800 to 1804 and titled himself as "Swami Nirgunanda". During his exile, he decided to build a replica of Pashupatinath Temple in Varanasi. Construction of the temple commenced during his exile / stay in Varanasi. During the construction, Shah moved back to Nepal. On 25 April 1806, Rana Bahadur Shah was stabbed to death by his stepbrother, Sher Bahadur Shah. His son Girvan Yuddha Bikram Shah Deva completed the project 20 years after the deadline. The land was later transferred to Rana Bahadur Shah by Kashi Naresh in the year 1843. The temple, adjacent area, Lalita Ghat and a dharamshala, belongs to the Nepal government.

Construction
The mandir is made of terracotta, stone and wood and took three decades to complete. The wood is termite proof. It is constructed in Nepali style of architecture and is surrounded by tamarind and ficus religiosa (peepal) trees. The temple has Pagoda style architecture, mainly carved out of wood. It has sculptures similar to ones displayed in Khajuraho Group of Monuments and hence it is also called "Mini Khajuraho".

Location

Nepali Mandir is located on Lalita Ghat in Varanasi. It is 3.8 kilometers South-East of Varanasi Junction railway station and 100 meters South-West of Manikarnika Ghat.

See also
Pashupatinath Temple
Hindu temples in Varanasi

References

Shiva temples in Varanasi
Hindu temples in Varanasi
1843 establishments in India